Alexandre Matheron (1926 – 7 January 2020) was a French philosopher specializing in Baruch Spinoza and modern politics. His 1969 work Individu et communauté chez Spinoza is "widely regarded as one of the landmarks of Spinoza scholarship."

Biography
Alexandre was the brother of mathematician Georges Matheron. He obtained a bachelor's degree in politics in 1949 and an agrégation in philosophy in 1956. The following year, he began teaching at the University of Algiers. He also left the French Communist Party, where he was very active. While in Algeria, Matheron decided to write his doctoral thesis on Spinoza. In 1963, he returned to Paris and enrolled at the French National Centre for Scientific Research to complete his doctoral degree under the direction of Martial Gueroult. His degree was completed in 1968.

His thesis, titled Individu et communauté chez Spinoza was officially published in 1969. Matheron published another work in 1971, titled Le Christ et le salut des Ignorants chez Spinoza. He was a founder in 1977 of the Association des Amis de Spinoza.

He worked as assistant professor at Paris Nanterre University, and then served as professor at Lumière University Lyon 2.

He died on 7 January 2020 after a period of ill health.

His work was first published in English in 2020 as a collection of essays titled Politics, Ontology and Ethics in Spinoza: Essays by Alexandre Matheron.

Publications
In French:
Individu et communauté chez Spinoza (Paris: Les Éditions de Minuit, 1969) ISBN 2707303917
Le Christ et le salut des Ignorants chez Spinoza (Paris: Éditions Aubier-Montaigne, 1971) 
Anthropologie et politique au XVIIe siècle. Études sur Spinoza (Paris: Vrin, 1985) 
Études sur Spinoza et les philosophies à l'âge classique (Lyon: ENS Lyon, 2011) ISBN 2847882189
In English:

 Politics, Ontology and Ethics in Spinoza: Essays by Alexandre Matheron, translated by Filippo Del Lucchese, David Maruzzella, and Gil Morejon. (Edinburgh: Edinburgh University Press, 2020) ISBN 147444010X

References

1926 births
2020 deaths
20th-century French philosophers
Academic staff of the University of Algiers
Academic staff of Paris Nanterre University
Academic staff of the University of Lyon
Academic staff of the École Normale Supérieure
21st-century Algerian people
Neo-Spinozism